Bangor-on-Dee Racecourse is a thoroughbred horse racing venue located in Bangor-on-Dee near Wrexham, Wales, United Kingdom.

It is a left-handed National Hunt racecourse, and does not have  a grandstand.

History 
Racing first took place at Bangor on Dee Racecourse in February 1859, and has since taken place regularly except during the wars.

Since 2006 Bangor has hosted amateur Point-to-Point races run by local hunts. The course for the Point-to-Point is on the inside of the main track and races are run right-handed.

In May 2012, all former Tote betting positions were replaced by the racecourse's own in-house bangorBET betting system.

The Clerk of the Course is Andrew Morris, who is also Clerk of the Course at sister track Chester, where flat racing takes place.

References

External links 
 
Bangor Point-to-Point website
Course guide on GG.COM
Course guide on Drawbias.com
Course guide on At The Races

Horse racing venues in Wales
Wrexham
1859 establishments in Wales
Sports venues completed in 1859